The Dudaim was an Israeli folk duo.

Dudaim or Duda'im may also refer to:
, Negev Desert, Israel
 (Nakhal Duda'im, Naẖal Duda'im), Negev Desert, Israel
 a hill ijn Haifa district, Israel
Dudaim melon, a variant of Cucumis melo (melon)